Elachista stictifica is a moth of the family Elachistidae. It is found in Australia.

The wingspan is 9.2–10.2 mm for males and 9.2–9.8 mm for females.

References

Moths described in 2011
stictifica
Moths of Australia